Passport to Rio (Spanish:Pasaporte a Río) is a 1948 Argentine crime film, directed by Daniel Tinayre and written by César Tiempo and Luis Saslavsky. It premiered on September 29, 1948.

Plot
A thief made a steal and is observed by a showgirl who becomes witness to the crime. Man discovers and forces to help you take what you stole from Rio de Janeiro. No other way out, she is shipped to Brazil by the thief. On the boat, the showgirl meets a doctor who initiates a love story while the offender is in love with the woman.

Cast
 Manuel Alcón 
 Alberto Barcel 
 Carlos Bellucci 
 Roberto Bordoni 
 Margarita Burke
 Warly Ceriani 
 Eduardo Cuitiño
 Arturo de Córdova
 Francisco de Paula
 Zoe Ducós
 Rodolfo Díaz Soler
 Pilar Gómez
 Alfredo Jordan
 Mirtha Legrand 
 Carmen Llambí 
 Mecha López
 Pedro Maratea
 Toti Muñoz
 Fausto Padín
 Jesús Pampín 
 Nathán Pinzón
 Alberto Quiles 
 Domingo Sapelli

External links
 

1948 films
1948 crime films
Argentine crime films
1940s Spanish-language films
Argentine black-and-white films
Films set in Brazil
Films directed by Daniel Tinayre
1940s Argentine films